Bahramabad (also Romanized as Bahrāmābād) is a village in Borborud-e Sharqi Rural District, in the Central District of Aligudarz County, Lorestan Province, Iran. At the 2006 census, its population was 125, in 17 families.

References 

Towns and villages in Aligudarz County